The spot-winged antbird (Myrmelastes leucostigma) is a species of bird in the family Thamnophilidae. It is found in humid forest in the Amazon north of the Amazon River, and in the far western Amazon and adjacent lower east Andean slopes.

The spot-winged antbird was described by the Austrian ornithologist August von Pelzeln in 1868 and given the binomial name Percnostola leucostigma. The Roraiman, Humaita, brownish-headed and rufous-faced antbird were formerly considered as subspecies, but based on the differences in voice and plumage characteristics they are now treated as separate species. As presently defined, the spot-winged antbird includes the subspecies infuscata, subplumbea and intensa.

The conservation status of the spot-winged antbird has been assessed by BirdLife International  to be of Least concern.

References

spot-winged antbird
Birds of the Amazon Basin
Birds of the Colombian Amazon
Birds of the Venezuelan Amazon
Birds of the Ecuadorian Amazon
Birds of the Peruvian Amazon
Birds of the Guianas
spot-winged antbird
Taxonomy articles created by Polbot